Bob Rogers may refer to:

 Bob Rogers (SAAF officer) (1921–2000), South African Air Force officer and Member of Parliament
 Bob Rogers (bobsleigh) (1923–1995), American Olympic bobsledder
 Bob Rogers (DJ) (born 1926), Australian radio disc jockey
 Bob Rogers (designer), founder and chairman of BRC Imagination Arts in the US
 Bob Rogers (novelist), American writer under the pennames of Lee Rogers, Jean Barrett, and Jean Thomas
 Bob Rogers (rower) (1934–2017), American athlete who competed at the 1960 Summer Olympics

See also
Bob Rodgers (fl. 1987-2012), former sportscaster and TV producer
Robert Rogers (disambiguation)